Bernard Descôteaux (born 1947 in Nicolet, Quebec) is a Canadian journalist. He was the 8th editor-in-chief of the Montreal-based newspaper Le Devoir, a post he occupied from 1999.

Under his leadership, the newspaper recorded profits and increased its circulation, in contrast to much of the rest of the sector. Descôteaux also developed the presence of the newspaper on the Internet.

In February 2016 Descôteaux retired from the editorship of Le Devoir.

References

External links
 Internet site of the newspaper

People from Centre-du-Québec
Writers from Quebec
1947 births
Living people
Le Devoir people